Gastone Nencini (1 March 1930 – 1 February 1980) was an Italian road racing cyclist who won the 1960 Tour de France and the 1957 Giro d'Italia.

Nicknamed Il Leone del Mugello, "The Lion of Mugello" (from his birthplace Barberino di Mugello, near Florence), Nencini was a powerful all-rounder, particularly strong in the mountains.

He was an amateur painter and a chain smoker. He was a gifted descender. "The only reason to follow Nencini downhill would be if you had a death wish", said the French rider Raphaël Géminiani. It was in trying to follow Nencini down a mountain on Stage 14 of the 1960 Tour de France that Roger Rivière missed a bend, crashed over a wall and broke his spine.

Downhill race

Nencini's downhill race with Henry Anglade has become part of the legend of cycling. Anglade was a proud rider and Nencini one of the fastest down hills.  They met at a col in the Dolomites during the Giro d'Italia. The weather was bad and a snowstorm had forced 57 riders to abandon that day. Anglade said:

I couldn't tolerate the idea that Nencini was the best descender of the peloton. I said to him, call the blackboard man, we'll do the descent together and whoever comes second pays for the aperitifs this evening. So he called the ardoisier and asked him to follow us. The road was of compressed earth. We attacked the drop flat out. I let Nencini take the lead so that I could see how he negotiated the bends before attacking him. In the end I dropped as though I was alone. At the bottom, I had taken 32 seconds out of him, written on the blackboard. I was really tickled. I had beaten Nencini. The next time I saw him was that evening in the hotel I was staying at. He had just bought me an apéritif!

Memory

At the Futa pass, on the mountains over his native Barberino di Mugello, a monument is placed to his memory: a big bronze bas-relief portrait of him racing and the inscription saying: "A Gastone Nencini. Il comune di Barberino, gli sportivi, i compagni di tante battaglie ricordano il campione mugellano" (translated from Italian: "To Gastone Nencini. The administration of Barberino, the sportsmen, the comrades of many battles remember the Mugello-born champion").

Career achievements 

1955
3rd Overall Giro d'Italia
1st Mountains classification
1st Stages 9 & 12 
1956
1st Tre Valli Varesine
1st Stage 22 Tour de France
1957
1st  Overall Giro d'Italia
1st Giro della Provincia di Reggio Calabria
Tour de France
1st Mountains classification
1st Stages 10 & 18
3rd Giro del Lazio
1958
1st Circuit of Omegna
1st Circuit of Lokeren
5th Overall Tour de France
1st Stage 19 
5th Overall Giro d'Italia
1st Stage 10 & 18 
1959
1st Stage 9 Giro d'Italia
1960
1st  Overall Tour de France
1st Grand Prix de Nice
1st Circuit of Montélimar
2nd Overall Giro d'Italia
1st Stages 5 & 10
3rd Milano–Torino
1961
1st Circuit of Acireale
2nd Trofeo Matteotti
1962 
2nd Giro dell'Appennino
1964
2nd Züri-Metzgete
3rd Overall Tour de Romandie

Grand Tour results timeline

See also
 List of doping cases in cycling

Notes and references

1930 births
1980 deaths
People from Barberino di Mugello
Italian male cyclists
Tour de France winners
Italian Tour de France stage winners
Giro d'Italia winners
Italian Giro d'Italia stage winners
Doping cases in cycling
Sportspeople from the Metropolitan City of Florence
Cyclists from Tuscany